Ademola Adebise is the current Managing Director/Chief executive officer of  Wema Bank Plc.

Early childhood
Adebise was born on October 31, 1966, in Lagos to the family of Mr & Mrs Adegoke Adebise. He attended the Surulere Baptist Primary School between 1972 and 1978, the Lagos Baptist Academy in 1978 after which he gained admission into the University of Lagos where he obtained a bachelor's degree in Computer Science between 1983 and 1987.

Adebise has a master's degree in Business Administration (MBA) from the Lagos Business School and attended the Advanced Management Program (AMP) of the Harvard Business School.

Career
Adebise worked as a Programmer/Systems analyst at an indigenous Information technology company in Nigeria in 1988 before he started his banking career at the Information technology department of Chartered Bank (Now Stanbic IBTC bank).

He has worked in the following capacities:

• Head of Information technology and the Chief financial officer (CFO) of the Chartered Bank  (1989 and 2000)

• Assistant General Manager at National Bank, supervised Risk Management, Treasury and Corporate Banking (2001 to 2005)

• General manager at National Bank (2005).

• Head of the Finance & Performance management Practice for Nigeria at Accenture (2005 -2009)

• Executive director in charge of South Bank, Deputy Managing Director (supervising Corporate Banking, Treasury, and Support Functions at Wema Bank (2009 to 2017)

In July 2018, Adebise became the acting Managing Director, following the retirement of Mr Segun Oloketuyi his predecessor. On approval by the Central Bank of Nigeria, he became the substantive MD/ CEO of Wema Bank on October 1, 2018.
Adebise serves on the board of Nigeria Inter-Bank Settlement System Plc (NIBSS), AIICO insurance Plc, and AIICO Pension Managers Limited.

Personal life
Adebise is married to Adejumoke Adebise and they have three children together. He is a practising Christian, involved in Community Development and an avid supporter of Arsenal F.C.

References 

1966 births
Living people
University of Lagos alumni
Nigerian chief executives
Nigerian bankers
Yoruba bankers
Baptist Academy alumni
Lagos Business School alumni
Businesspeople from Lagos
20th-century Nigerian businesspeople
21st-century Nigerian businesspeople